Les Jago (10 December 1907 – 8 August 1985) was an  Australian rules footballer who played with St Kilda in the Victorian Football League (VFL).

Notes

External links 

1907 births
1985 deaths
Australian rules footballers from Victoria (Australia)
St Kilda Football Club players
South Warrnambool Football Club players